Agh Davahlu-ye Olya (also Romanized as Āgh Davahlū-ye ‘Olyā; also known as Āq Davahlū-ye Bālā and Āq Davallū-ye Bālā) is a village in Arshaq-e Markazi Rural District, Arshaq District, Meshgin Shahr County, Ardabil Province, Iran. At the 2006 census, its population was 69, in 16 families.

References 

Towns and villages in Meshgin Shahr County